Umar Arteh Ghalib or Omer Carte Qalib (1930 – 18 November 2020) was a Somali politician. He was Prime Minister of the Somali Democratic Republic from January 24, 1991 to May 1993. Previously he served as Foreign Minister from 1969 to 1976.

Early life and education
Ghalib was born in British Somaliland in 1930. He was a member of the Sa'ad Musa sub-division of the Habr Awal Isaaq clan, and belonged to the United Somali Congress.

He underwent elementary and intermediate education in Hargeisa and completed his secondary education in Sheikh, and his higher education in England where he was educated at Bristol University in the UK.

Career

Early career
He started his career as a school master and then headmaster of elementary schools of Las Anod, Berbera and Hargeisa respectively. Just before he went to UK in 1956, he was appointed as vice principal of Sheikh Intermediate School. After his success in Sheikh, he went to England for higher Education. On his return in 1958 he was promoted as the first principal of Gabiley Intermediate Boarding School.

Minister of Foreign Affairs
From 1969 to 1976, Ghalib served as Foreign Minister. As Foreign Minister, in January, 1972 he was President of the United Nations Security Council. In 1972, he was the lead mediator between Uganda and Tanzania during the Uganda–Tanzania War. Ghalib brought Somalia into the Arab League in 1974 during his term as Foreign Minister of Somalia.

Prime Minister of Somali Democratic Republic
On 24 January 1991, and after two years under house arrest, he was appointed by then-President of Somali Democratic Republic Siad Barre as the last Prime Minister. However, before any transfer of power could take place, the United Somali Congress rapid advance forced Barre to flee Mogadishu. After Barre's ouster, the next president, Ali Mahdi Muhammad, reappointed Ghalib as prime minister, a position Ghalib would hold until May 1993.

Imprisonment, trial, and fall of government 

Ghalib was dismissed from his position in 1982 after disagreeing with Barre's increasingly overt policy of supporting the ethnic Somali insurrection in Ethiopia's Somali Region. Ghalib was subsequently arrested, and in 1989, after spending seven years in prison without charges, he was tried for treason and sentenced to death. Following protests from various foreign governments, Siad Barre commuted Ghalib's sentence but kept him under house arrest. In late January 1991, as his regime was collapsing, Siad Barre asked Ghalib to form a new government that would negotiate with the rebels, but the USC military successes forced Siad Barre's flight from the capital before any transfer of power could be completed.

Notes

1930 births
2020 deaths
20th-century educators
20th-century prime ministers of Somalia
Somali Youth League politicians
Heads of government who were later imprisoned
Prime Ministers of Somalia
British Somaliland people
Alumni of the University of Bristol
Somalian educators
Somalian prisoners sentenced to death
Prisoners sentenced to death by Somalia
People convicted of treason